Longfellow School is a 2-story, brick and sandstone elementary school in Boise, Idaho, designed by Wayland & Fennell and completed in 1906. The Mission Revival building has been in operation as a school since opening, and it was added to the National Register of Historic Places in 1982.

The building design featured separate entrances for boys and girls, 12 classrooms, and a basement apartment for the janitor. Longfellow School was the seventh schoolhouse constructed within the limits of Boise's Independent School District.

References

External links
 
 Longfellow Elementary School website

Further reading
 J. Howard Moon, A Centennial History of Schools of the State of Idaho (State School Boards Association, 1990), pp 1-12

		
National Register of Historic Places in Ada County, Idaho
School buildings completed in 1906
1906 establishments in Idaho